Surrendered Enemy Personnel (SEP) is a designation for captive enemy soldiers (similar to Disarmed Enemy Forces). It was most commonly used by British forces towards German forces in Europe, and towards Japanese and associated forces in Asia after the end of World War II.

On March 1, 1947 the U.S. stated that the SEPs should be regarded as POW's and be treated in accordance with the Geneva conventions.

The designation of SEP allowed the Royal Navy to use the German command structure to facilitate the disbandment of the Kriegsmarine.

In the Malay Emergency the UK also used the definition SEP, alongside Captured Enemy Personnel (CEP). The distinction made was that SEP were insurgents who  surrendered to the British, while Captured Enemy Personnel were not.  Both designations were treated as Prisoners of War.

See also
 Disarmed Enemy Forces
 Japanese Surrendered Personnel
 Prisoner of War
 Laws of war

References

Further reading
 Surrendered Enemy Personnel (Hansard, 22 October 1946)
 SURRENDERED ENEMY PERSONNEL (STATUS) (Hansard, 17 June 1947)

Military personnel of World War II
World War II prisoners of war